Ziradei Assembly constituency is an assembly constituency in Siwan district in the Indian state of Bihar. Amarjeet Kushwaha is a member of the legislative assembly from Ziradei.

Overview
As per Delimitation of Parliamentary and Assembly constituencies Order, 2008, No. 106 Ziradei Assembly constituency is composed of the following: Ziradei, Nautan and Mairwa community development blocks.

Ziradei Assembly constituency is part of No. 18 Siwan (Lok Sabha constituency) .

Members of Legislative Assembly

Election results

2020

References

External links
 

Assembly constituencies of Bihar
Politics of Siwan district